Shamokin (Saponi Algonquian Schahamokink, meaning "place of eels") (Lenape Indian language: Shahëmokink) is a city in Northumberland County, Pennsylvania, United States. Surrounded by Coal Township at the western edge of the Anthracite Coal Region in central Pennsylvania's Susquehanna River Valley, the city was named after a Saponi Indian village, Schahamokink. At the 2020 decennial United States Census, the population was 6,942.

History
The first human settlement of Shamokin was probably Shawnee natives migrants. A large population of Delaware Indians (also known as the Lenapes) were also forcibly resettled there in the early 18th century after they lost rights to their land in the "Walking Purchase" (also known as the "Walking Treaty") along the eastern border of the colonial Province of Pennsylvania in the upper northern reaches of the Delaware River in 1737. Canasatego of the Six Nations, enforcing the Walking Purchase on behalf of George Thomas, Deputy Governor of Pennsylvania (1738–1747), ordered the Delaware Indians to go to two places on the Susquehanna River.

The city of present-day Shamokin lies along Shamokin Creek. Shamokin was founded in 1835 by the coal speculators John C. Boyd and Ziba Bird, it was early known as Boyd's Stone-coal Quarry, Boydtown, and New Town. The discovery of anthracite coal resources in the region, known as "hard coal," became the basis of much industry. Railroad companies, such as Reading Railroad, bought interests in coal and became major employers of the area, building railroads to ship coal to markets and controlling most jobs. Workers gradually organized into unions to develop means of bargaining with these powerful companies. During the nationwide Great Railroad Strike of July 1877, workers in the 1877 Shamokin uprising at that time marched and demonstrated during the summer period of labor unrest.

Shamokin was incorporated earlier as a borough under the Commonwealth constitution on November 9, 1864, and subsequently as a city 85 years later, on February 21, 1949. In addition to anthracite coal-mining, it became an industrial center in the 19th century, with silk and knitting mills, stocking and shirt factories, wagon shops, ironworks, and brickyards. The dominant Eagle Silk Mill became the largest textile manufacturing building under one roof in the United States.

Famous inventor, scientist and entrepreneur Thomas A. Edison (1847–1931), briefly a resident of nearby Sunbury, established the Edison Illuminating Company of Shamokin in the fall of 1882. When the Shamokin power generating station on Independence Street started on September 22, 1883, St. Edward's Roman Catholic Church which was connected, became the first church in the world to be lit by electricity. Until 2017, Jones Hardware Company was located at the Independence Street site of the former 1882 Edison electrical station in Shamokin.)

In the 1877 Shamokin uprising, railroad workers and miners angered by unexpected cuts in wages begun by the Baltimore and Ohio Railroad (B&O) joined what developed across the East with the Great Railroad Strike of 1877, which began with strikes in neighboring Martinsburg, West Virginia, then others in Maryland including the headquarters of the B&O at its Camden Street Station in downtown Baltimore then spread north and west into Pennsylvania and to Pittsburgh and other sites conducted in several major industrial cities in Pennsylvania, as well as more cities in the Northeast and as far west through to St. Louis and Missouri. Mayor William Douty commissioned a citizen manned local militia unit to help during the unrest. They shot into a group of strikers, wounding 12 and killing two bystanders who were not even involved in the protest. Five strikers were convicted of rioting and jailed for up to eight months for their part in the actions.

At the turn of the 20th century, resident William A. Conway wrote Murder at Hickory Ridge (1905) as a "dime novel", hoping to cash in on their popularity. It was a fictionalized account of an unsolved murder in the Shamokin area. His two brothers, Alphonsus E. and John J., printed the book on a press in their garage. They continued their business, starting the Conway Print Shop. With the profits from the sale of the novel, the Conway brothers later started the Black Diamond Publishing Company in 1905 and founded Black Diamond Magazine to disseminate news of the anthracite coal region. The brothers developed a way to print a roll of tickets, planning to market them to the new movie theaters being built in the area. To meet a request by the nearby Hazleton Baseball Club, they partnered with merchant Nicholas R. Ludes to make a big purchase of colored paper.

Together the Conway brothers and Ludes founded what became the National Ticket Company, located in Shamokin since 1907. At one time it was the largest ticket manufacturing company in the United States. Their first production facility was built in 1911 at the corner of Pearl and Webster Streets. A 1942 fire gutted the plant, although the brick shell still stands. The replacement building at Pearl Street and Ticket Avenue was completed in 1950 and has since served as company headquarters. The business is still owned by descendants of the Conway and Ludes families. In the 21st century National Ticket has developed international customers as well to grow its business.

Edgewood Park, also known as Indian Park, was operated in Shamokin as an increasing popular amusement park from 1905 through the late 1950s, featuring a roller coaster and other rides and entertainments, and attracting regional crowds. Its  included a large pond. Faced with different needs in the 1950s, the Shamokin area school district developed this property for new elementary and high schools.

The Victoria Theatre in town was listed on the National Register of Historic Places maintained by the U.S. Department of the Interior in 1985.  It unfortunately was demolished in 1999 and delisted in 2004.

Geography

Shamokin has two small creeks that divide the town. Carbon Run merges with Shamokin Creek in the north of the town and ultimately empties into the Susquehanna River just south of Shamokin Dam near Sunbury.

The hardiness zone is 6a.

It is also home to the world's largest man made culm bank – the Cameron/Glen Burn Colliery Culm Bank.

Demographics

As of the census of 2000, there were 8,009 people, 3,742 households, and 2,028 families residing in the city. The population density was 9,601.9 people per square mile (3,725.7/km2). There were 4,674 housing units at an average density of 5,603.6 per square mile (2,174.3/km2). The racial makeup of the city was 98.8% White, 0.1% African American, 0.1% Native American, 0.3% Asian, 0.0% Pacific Islander, 0.1% from other races, and 0.5% from two or more races. Hispanic or Latino people of any race were 0.6% of the population.

There were 3,742 households, out of which 24.0% had children under the age of 18 living with them, 36.4% were married couples living together, 13.0% had a female householder with no husband present, and 45.8% were non-families. 41.2% of all households were made up of individuals, and 22.6% had someone living alone who was 65 years of age or older. The average household size was 2.13 and the average family size was 2.89.

In the city, the population had 22.2% under the age of 18, 7.2% from 18 to 24, 26.2% from 25 to 44, 22.6% from 45 to 64, and 21.9% who were 65 years of age or older. The median age was 41 years. For every 100 females, there were 86.2 males. For every 100 females age 18 and over, there were 80.6 males.

The median income for a household in the city was $20,173, and the median income for a family was $30,038. Males had a median income of $28,261 versus $19,120 for females. The per capita income was $12,354. About 19.3% of families and 60.2% of the population were below the poverty line, including 34.2% of those under age 18 and 21.3% of those age 65 or over.

Education

Shamokin is part of the  public Shamokin Area School Districtwhich contains Shamokin Area High School, along with an elementary, intermediate, and middle school. Local private schools include Our Lady of Lourdes Regional School and Meadowview Christian Academy. Luzerne County Community College (LCCC) has a satellite campus in the Careerlink Building, Arch Street, Shamokin.

In popular culture
 Shamokin is referenced in the 1930 film King of Jazz during the "Has Anybody Seen Our Nellie?" number in the final line of the chorus, "Please send her back to Shamokin, P-A."
 Shamokin became infamous for a fire at its Dunkin' Donuts in 2016; a local news video with citizens expressing their displeasure went viral.
 Featured in the song "We Danced the Samba in Shamokin" (1958), conducted by Henry Mancini.  The song was sampled as bumper music for Bob and Ray's radio show on WOR (AM) in the mid-1970s.
 On the Allan Sherman album My Son, the Folk Singer, Sherman parodies "The Yellow Rose of Texas", referencing Shamokin in the medley Shticks and Stones

Notable people

 Kathryn Burak, novelist 
 Harry Coveleski (1886–1950), Major League Baseball pitcher for the Detroit Tigers in the American League
 Stan Coveleski (1889–1984), a Major League Baseball pitcher and now noted in the National Baseball Hall of Fame and Museum
 George H. Cram (1838–1872), Union Army colonel in the American Civil War (1861–1865) and brevet general in the post-war Reconstruction era
 Jake Daubert, Major League Baseball player for the Brooklyn Dodgers
 Tony Deppen, Professional Wrestler for AEW and ROH 
 Charles K. Eagle (d. 1928), silk merchant
 John Grazier (1946–2022), American realist painter
 Herbert G. Hopwood (1898–1966), United States Navy, four star admiral and commander-in-chief of the U.S. Pacific Fleet, 1958–1960
 Eddie Korbich, Broadway, film and television actor
 Mary LeSawyer, operatic soprano
 Harry J. Lincoln, early 1900s popular music composer
 Michael Luchkovich, first ethnic Ukrainian member of the House of Commons of Canada (1926–1935)
 Fred Rhoads, cartoonist of Sad Sack
 Holden C. Richardson, (USN) (1878–1960), pioneer in U.S. naval aviation
 Ronald L. Thompson, Pennsylvania state legislator
 Thomas I. Vanaskie, federal judge on the United States Court of Appeals for the Third Circuit
 Bud Weiser, Major League Baseball player, played for the Philadelphia Phillies in the National League
 William Wood (c. 1861–1908), illusionist and ventriloquist
 Joseph Zupicich (1893–1987), crewmember of the steamship RMS Carpathia, which assisted in the rescue operation for the RMS Titanic

References

External links

Website for the City of Shamokin
Historic and modern photos of Shamokin
Photos and historic postcards of Shamokin, Flickr account
Shamokin Area School District, official website
The News Item, local newspaper and website for Shamokin and Mount Carmel.
Adamic, Louis. "The Great Bootleg Coal Industry", The Nation, Vol. 140, No. 3627, January 9, 1934; p. 46 
History of the Shamokin Coal Township Public Library
Edgewood Park, defunctparks.com

Cities in Pennsylvania
Populated places established in 1835
Municipalities of the Anthracite Coal Region of Pennsylvania
Cities in Northumberland County, Pennsylvania
Coal towns in Pennsylvania